Lency Montelier Ellacia (born 13 February 1971) is a retired female track and field athlete from Cuba, best known for winning the gold medal in the women's 400m hurdles at the 1991 Pan American Games in Havana, Cuba.

International competitions

References

Cuban female hurdlers
Cuban female sprinters
1971 births
Living people
Athletes (track and field) at the 1991 Pan American Games
Athletes (track and field) at the 1995 Pan American Games
Place of birth missing (living people)
Pan American Games gold medalists for Cuba
Pan American Games bronze medalists for Cuba
Pan American Games medalists in athletics (track and field)
Central American and Caribbean Games gold medalists for Cuba
Competitors at the 1993 Central American and Caribbean Games
Central American and Caribbean Games medalists in athletics
Medalists at the 1991 Pan American Games
Medalists at the 1995 Pan American Games